Glendon Lionel Gibbs (December 27, 1925, Georgetown, British Guiana (now Georgetown, Guyana) – February 21, 1979, Georgetown, Guyana) was a West Indian cricketer who played in one Test in 1955.

Glendon Gibbs was a left-handed opening batsman and an occasional slow left-arm bowler who played regularly in West Indies cricket for British Guiana from 1949–50 to 1962–63. In 1951, playing against Barbados at Bourda cricket ground, Georgetown, he scored 216 and put on 390 for the first wicket with Leslie Wight, then a West Indies record.

Gibbs' single Test match was the first game in the 1954–55 series at home to the Australians at Kingston, Jamaica. He scored 12 and 0 and was dropped for the next match. In a period when West Indies sometimes struggled to find reliable openers, he was perhaps unlucky not to receive further chances.

After he retired from playing, he became an administrator, and was secretary of the Guyana Cricket Board of Control at the time of his death.

References

External links
 Glendon Gibbs at Cricket Archive
 Glendon Gibbs at Cricinfo

1925 births
1979 deaths
West Indies Test cricketers
Guyanese cricket administrators
Guyanese cricketers
Guyana cricketers
Sportspeople from Georgetown, Guyana